Elina Araratovna Avanesyan (born 17 September 2002) is a Russian-Armenian  tennis player. She has career-high WTA rankings of 122 in singles and 306 in doubles. She has won four singles and nine doubles titles at tournaments of the ITF Circuit.

Career
Avanesyan won her first major ITF title at the 2021 Reinert Open.

She made her WTA Tour debut at the 2022 Copa Colsanitas, and her Grand Slam debut as a qualifier at the 2022 US Open.

Also in 2022, she entered the main draw of the new WTA 1000 Guadalajara Open as a lucky loser.

Performance timeline

Only main-draw results in WTA Tour, Grand Slam tournaments, Fed Cup/Billie Jean King Cup and Olympic Games are included in win–loss records.

Singles
Current after the 2023 Merida Open.

ITF Circuit finals

Singles: 11 (4 titles, 7 runner–ups)

Doubles: 16 (9 titles, 7 runner-ups)

Notes

References

External links
 
 

2002 births
Living people
Russian female tennis players
Russian people of Armenian descent